The houses at 1907–1951 N. 32nd St., also known as Mansion Court, are a set of 12 historic double houses located in the Strawberry Mansion neighborhood of Philadelphia, Pennsylvania.  They were built about 1894, and are three-story, Pompeiian brick dwellings in the Late Victorian style.  They are characterized by pressed metal cornices, roof crests, and two-story bay windows.  The first floors have recessed porches with ornamental ceilings.  The house at 1951 N. 32nd St. has a corner tower.

It was added to the National Register of Historic Places in 1993.

References

Houses on the National Register of Historic Places in Philadelphia
Houses completed in 1894
Strawberry Mansion, Philadelphia